Caio da Silva Prado Júnior (February 11, 1907November 23, 1990) was a Brazilian historian, geographer, writer, philosopher and politician.

His works inaugurated a new historiographic tradition in Brazil, identified with Marxism, which led to new interpretations of the Brazilian colonial society.

Biography 

Caio Prado graduated with a degree in law from Faculdade do Largo de São Francisco, São Paulo in 1928, where he would later become a Professor of Political Economy. He was politically active during the 1930s and 1940s, including during the 1930 Revolution. In 1933, he published his first work - Evolução Política do Brasil (Political Evolution of Brazil) - an attempt to understand the country's political and social history. In 1934 he took part in the foundation of Brazilian Geographers Association.

After a trip to the Soviet Union, at the time under Stalin's dictatorship, he published URSS - um novo mundo (Soviet Union - a New World), which was banned by Getúlio Vargas' government's censorship. He then joined the Aliança Nacional Libertadora which he chaired in São Paulo.

In 1942 he published the classic Formação do Brasil Contemporâneo - Colônia (Formation of Contemporary Brazil - Colony)
, which should have been the first part of a work on Brazilian historic evolution. However, the following volumes were never written. In 1945 he was elected deputado estadual for the Brazilian Communist Party. He published the newspaper A Platéia and, in 1943, with Arthur Neves and Monteiro Lobato, he founded Editora Brasiliense (Brasiliense Publishing House), for which, later, he published Revista Brasiliense, between 1956 and 1964. After 1964, he was persecuted by the military dictatorship.

In 1966 he was elected Intellectual of the Year by the União Brasileira de Escritores, following the publication of A revolução brasileira (Brazilian Revolution).

Works
The most important works of Caio Prado Junior are:

 1933: Evolução política do Brasil
 1934: URSS - um novo mundo
 1942: Formação do Brasil Contemporâneo (translated as The colonial background of modern Brazil Berkeley : University of California Press, 1967)
 1945: História Econômica do Brasil Access here 
 1952: Dialética do Conhecimento
 1953: Evolução Política do Brasil e Outros Estudos
 1954: Diretrizes para uma Política Econômica Brasileira
 1957: Esboço de Fundamentos da Teoria Econômica
 1959: Introdução à Lógica Dialética (Notas Introdutórias)
 1962: O Mundo do Socialismo
 1966: A Revolução Brasileira
 1971: Estruturalismo de Lévi-Strauss - O Marxismo de Louis Althusser
 1972: História e Desenvolvimento
 1979: A Questão Agrária no Brasil
 1980: O que é Liberdade
 1981: O que é Filosofia
 1983: A Cidade de São Paulo

External links 
Economic history of Brazil, author Caio Prado Junior, in Portuguese

References

1907 births
1990 deaths
People from São Paulo
20th-century Brazilian historians
Brazilian Marxists
University of São Paulo alumni
Academic staff of the University of São Paulo
Brazilian geographers
Marxist historians
20th-century geographers
20th-century Brazilian philosophers